Wied-Dierdorf was a County of Rhineland-Palatinate, Germany, located on the Wied River. It was created as a partition of Wied in 1631, and was inherited by Wied-Neuwied in 1709.

Counts of Wied-Dierdorf (1631–1709)
John Ernest (1631–1664)
Louis Frederick (1664–1709)

Counties of the Holy Roman Empire
States and territories established in 1631
1631 establishments in the Holy Roman Empire